WGKL (105.5 FM, "Kool 105.5") is a radio station broadcasting a classic hits format. Licensed to Gladstone, Michigan, it first began broadcasting in 1999 after being silent for years.

References
Michiguide.com - WGKL History

External links
 Official Website
 

GKL
Classic hits radio stations in the United States
Radio stations established in 1999
1999 establishments in Michigan